The 1970 Copa Argentina was played between March 1970 and March 1971. The tournament was played as a knockout competition, with the participation of 32 teams; 18 of the Primera División, 1 of the Primera B, 13 of the Regional leagues.

Teams

Primera División

Argentinos Juniors
Atlanta
Banfield
Chacarita Juniors
Colón
Gimnasia y Esgrima (LP)
Huracán
Independiente
Lanús
Los Andes
Newell's Old Boys
Platense
Quilmes
Racing
Rosario Central
San Lorenzo
Unión
Vélez Sársfield

Primera B 
Ferro Carril Oeste

Regional leagues

All Boys (SR)
Atenas (ST)
Argentinos del Norte
Bartolomé Mitre (P)
Central Norte
Central Norte Argentino
Colón Junior
Instituto
Juventud Unida Universitario
Mitre (SdE)
Palmira
Rosario Puerto Belgrano
Quilmes (MdP)

Round of 32

|-

|-

|-

|-

|-

|-

|-

|-

|-

|-

|-

|-

|-

|-

|-

|-
|}

Round of 16

Final

The Second leg was never played so the tournament was unfinished.

External links
RSSSF: Copa Argentina 70

1970 domestic association football cups
Copa
Copa Argentina